Acyl-coenzyme A thioesterase 8 is an enzyme that in humans is encoded by the ACOT8 gene.

The protein encoded by this gene is a peroxisomal thioesterase that appears to be involved more in the oxidation of fatty acids rather than in their formation. The encoded protein can bind to the human immunodeficiency virus-1 protein Nef, and mediate Nef-induced down-regulation of CD4 in T-cells. Multiple transcript variants encoding several different isoforms have been found for this gene.

References

Further reading

External links
 
 

Human proteins